The Two Orphans (French: Les deux orphelines) is a 1933 French historical drama film directed by Maurice Tourneur and starring Rosine Deréan, Renée Saint-Cyr and Gabriel Gabrio. The film's sets were designed by the art director Lucien Aguettand. The film was based on the play The Two Orphans which had been turned into several films. Tourneur altered the story slightly by moving it forward from the French Revolution to the Napoleonic Era.

Cast

See also
 Orphans of the Storm (1921)
 The Two Orphans (1942)
 The Two Orphans (1954)
 The Two Orphans (1965)
 The Two Orphans (1976)

References

Bibliography 
 Waldman, Harry. Maurice Tourneur: The Life and Films. McFarland, 2001.

External links 
 

1933 films
French historical drama films
1930s historical drama films
1930s French-language films
Films directed by Maurice Tourneur
French films based on plays
Films set in the 19th century
Films scored by Jacques Ibert
French black-and-white films
1933 drama films
1930s French films